C. Mammutty is a member of 13th and 14th Kerala Legislative Assembly. He belongs to Indian Union Muslim League and represented Tirur (State Assembly constituency) from 2011 to 2021. He was previously elected to Kerala Legislative Assembly in 2001.

Positions held
Entered politics through M.S.F. and was its Branch Secretary (1971)
Taluk Secretary (1975), Taluk President (1977), District Treasurer (1978), District General Secretary (1979), District President (1980) and State General Secretary (1982–85) of Muslim Students Federation - MSF
 Member, State Youth Welfare Board (1985–88)  
 Editor, M.S.F. Review Magazine (1982–88)
 Union Councillor, Calicut University (1981)
 Union Secretary and Students Council Secretary, Calicut University (1982) 
 State General Secretary, Muslim Youth League (1988-1999) 
 Chief Editor, 'Thoolika Magazine' (1988–99)
 Joint Secretary, Muslim League, Wayanad (1989)
 Chairman, Hantex (1993–96)
 Member, All India Handloom Director Board (1993–96)

Personal life
He was born on 10 February 1960 at Kelloor. He has a masters in arts and bachelors in law. He is a businessman. He is married to Laila and has four daughters.

References

Indian Union Muslim League politicians
1960 births
Living people
Kerala MLAs 2016–2021